The Staffordshire Yeomanry (Queen's Own Royal Regiment) was a unit of the British Army. Raised in 1794 following Prime Minister William Pitt's order to raise volunteer bodies of men to defend Great Britain from foreign invasion, the Staffordshire Yeomanry began as a volunteer cavalry regiment.

It first served overseas at the time of the Second Boer War. Following distinguished action in Egypt and Palestine in the First World War, it developed with the deployment of artillery and tanks. The Staffordshire Yeomanry became part of the Mercian Yeomanry in 1971 (renamed the Queen's Own Mercian Yeomanry in 1973) with one of the squadrons being designated B (Staffordshire Yeomanry) Squadron.

History

Formation and early history
The regiment was formed on 4 July 1794 with commanding officer being Colonel George, Earl Gower. The regiment was divided into Troops associated with the Staffordshire towns of Newcastle-under-Lyme, Stafford, Lichfield, Leek and Walsall. The uniform of the regiment was: a red jacket with yellow facings, white waistcoat, white leather breeches and military boots. On their head the members wore a helmet with a bearskin crest and feather at the side and were armed with a sword and pistol. The regimental motto was "Pro aris et focis" and the badge was the Staffordshire knot. The regiment was first called out in 1795 in order to support the civil powers in suppressing a bread riot. Future Prime Minister Robert Peel was an officer in the Staffordshire Yeomanry Cavalry in 1820.

In 1842, the regiment was embodied for 6 weeks when riots took place. As a result, the regiment was presented with 12 silver trumpets inscribed "Presented by a grateful County to the Queen's Own Royal Yeomanry for their services in 1842". By 1875, the regiment had expanded to 12 Troops with headquarters at Lichfield. The strength on 1 December 1875 was stated to be 495 with 104 wanting to complete. At this point, the uniform was blue with scarlet facing and silver lace.

Imperial Yeomanry

The Yeomanry was not intended to serve overseas, but due to the string of defeats during Black Week in December 1899, the British government realized they were going to need more troops than just the regular army. A Royal Warrant was issued on 24 December 1899 to allow volunteer forces to serve in the Second Boer War. The Royal Warrant asked standing Yeomanry regiments to provide service companies of approximately 115 men each for the Imperial Yeomanry. The regiment provided the 6th (Staffordshire) Company for the 4th Battalion in 1900 and the 106th (Staffordshire) Company for the same battalion in 1901. The regiment moved to Tamworth Street in Lichfield (since demolished) in 1905 and to Friar's Walk (off Bailey Street) in Stafford in 1914.

First World War

In accordance with the Territorial and Reserve Forces Act 1907 (7 Edw. 7, c.9) which brought the Territorial Force into being, the TF was intended to be a home defence force for service during wartime and members could not be compelled to serve outside the country. However, on the outbreak of war on 4 August 1914, many members volunteered for Imperial Service. Therefore, TF units were split in August and September 1914 into 1st Line (liable for overseas service) and 2nd Line (home service for those unable or unwilling to serve overseas) units. Later, a 3rd Line was formed to act as a reserve, providing trained replacements for the 1st and 2nd Line regiments.

1/1st Staffordshire Yeomanry
The Staffordshire Yeomanry, after a short period of training at Diss, Norfolk with the North Midland Mounted Brigade, was ordered to join the Egyptian Expeditionary Force in 1915. The Regiment was attached to the 22nd Mounted Brigade, Yeomanry Mounted Division in the Sinai and Palestine Campaign against the Ottoman Turkish and German army 1916–1918. It fought in the indecisive First Battle of Gaza and Second Battle of Gaza in March and April 1917. They finally won through in the Third Battle of Gaza in October 1917 and the crucial follow up Battle of Beersheba on 6 November 1917, where Allied victory at last left the field open for the capture of Jerusalem on 9 December 1917.

In July 1918, the Division was reformed as the Fourth Cavalry Division under the command of General Allenby and the Regiment played a key role in the decisive Battle of Megiddo (1918). The 1/1st Staffordshire Yeomanry joined the Desert Mounted Corps under the Australian General Harry Chauvel and took part in his strategic cavalry 'bound' from the desert through Beisan, a forced march which covered an epic 87 miles in 33 hours: a record in cavalry history. After resting for four days, during which they took 5,800 prisoners, they converged with the spearhead of the Allied advance and made a triumphal entry into the Syrian city of Damascus with Allenby on 1 October 1918.

After a week, the Regiment started on a 200-mile trek to Aleppo, having been reduced to just 75 men, 200 of them having become casualties from malignant malaria caught in the Jordan valley. However, Aleppo was captured on 25 October 1918. Five days later, Turkey surrendered.

2/1st Staffordshire Yeomanry
The 2nd Line regiment was formed in 1914. In 1915, it joined the 2/1st North Midland Mounted Brigade. In October, the brigade joined the 1st Mounted Division in Norfolk, replacing the 1st Line brigade. On 31 March 1916, the remaining Mounted Brigades were ordered to be numbered in a single sequence and the brigade became the 3rd Mounted Brigade.

In July 1916, there was a major reorganization of 2nd Line yeomanry units in the United Kingdom. All but 12 regiments were converted to cyclists and as a consequence the regiment was dismounted and joined the 3rd Cyclist Brigade (and the division became 1st Cyclist Division) in the Holt area.

A further reorganization in November 1916 saw the regiment remounted along with the rest of the brigade which was redesignated as the new 2nd Mounted Brigade in the new 1st Mounted Division (originally 3rd Mounted Division) at Stansted. By May 1917, it was at Leybourne near West Malling in Kent.

The regiment was once again converted to cyclists in August 1917 and joined 12th Cyclist Brigade in The Cyclist Division. By the end of 1917, it was at Tonbridge and then to Canterbury where it remained until the end of the war.

3/1st Staffordshire Yeomanry
The 3rd Line regiment was formed in 1915 and in the summer it was affiliated to a Reserve Cavalry Regiment at Aldershot. In the summer of 1916, it was affiliated to 12th Reserve Cavalry Regiment also at Aldershot. Early in 1917, the regiment was absorbed into the 3rd Reserve Cavalry Regiment still at Aldershot.

Between the wars
Post war, a commission was set up to consider the shape of the Territorial Force (Territorial Army from 1 October 1921). The experience of the First World War made it clear that cavalry was surfeit. The commission decided that only the 14 most senior regiments were to be retained as cavalry (though the Lovat Scouts and the Scottish Horse were also to remain mounted as "scouts"). Eight regiments were converted to Armoured Car Companies of the Royal Tank Corps (RTC), one was reduced to a battery in another regiment, one was absorbed into a local infantry battalion, one became a signals regiment and two were disbanded. The remaining 25 regiments were converted to brigades of the Royal Field Artillery between 1920 and 1922. As the 5th most senior regiment in the order of precedence, the regiment was retained as horsed cavalry.

Second World War

North Africa
In 1939, the Staffordshire Yeomanry was part of the 6th Cavalry Brigade, 1st Cavalry Division, with the Warwickshire Yeomanry and Cheshire Yeomanry. The 6th Cavalry Brigade arrived in Palestine in January 1940 and took part in mounted operations with the police to suppress disturbances between the Arab and Jewish populations.

The Staffordshire Yeomanry retained its horses until 1941, when it converted to tanks as part of the Royal Armoured Corps (RAC) and then served in North Africa in the 8th Armoured Brigade, which was part of the 10th Armoured Division. When the 10th Armoured Division was ordered back to Egypt, the 8th Armoured Brigade was left behind as an independent brigade. At the end of November, the brigade came under the command of the 7th Armoured Division, the famous Desert Rats and was involved in the battles around El Agheila.

During its time in North Africa, the Staffordshire Yeomanry fought at the Battles of Alam Halfa and El Alamein, fighting the Afrika Korps all the way into Tunisia.

Invasion of Normandy

The regiment was transferred to England to serve in the 27th Armoured Brigade, part of the British Second Army, commanded by Lieutenant-General Sir Miles Dempsey. The Staffordshire Yeomanry was probably the only conventional tank unit (i.e. equipped with neither DD nor flail) to land on D-Day, 6 June 1944, on Sword Beach. The Shermans of the Staffordshire Yeomanry landed on the morning of D-Day to support 185th Brigade, the spearhead of 3rd Division's attack inland.

The regiment continued to fight in the Battle of Normandy as part of the 27th Armoured Brigade until July 1944, when the brigade was disbanded after suffering heavy losses and the regiment was once again transferred back to England to join the 79th Armoured Division.

Battle of the Scheldt
The Staffordshire Yeomanry converted to Sherman DD tanks and B Squadron supported the 52nd (Lowland) Infantry Division in the assault on South Beveland, during the Battle of the Scheldt.

Operation Plunder
More training ensued and, on 23 March 1945, the regiment used Sherman DD tanks in the Rhine crossings.

Post war
The Staffordshire Yeomanry reformed in the RAC in 1947 with the following organisation:
 HQ at Stafford
 A Squadron at Walsall
 B Squadron at Stoke-on-Trent
 C Squadron at Burton-on-Trent

In 1967, the regiment was reorganised as infantry as The Staffordshire Yeomanry (Queen's Own Royal Regiment). It absorbed some Staffordshire Royal Artillery (RA) and Royal Engineers (RE) units, but also transferred some personnel to the 5th/6th Battalion Staffordshire Regiment), giving the following organisation:
 HQ at Wolverhampton
 A Squadron at Wolverhampton, formed from Staffordshire Yeomanry and HQ RA 48th (South Midland) Division
 B (887 Locating Battery) Squadron at Stafford, formed from 887 Locating Battery, RA (formerly 61st (North Midland) Field Regiment, RA) and part of 125 Engineer Regiment, RE (originally 59th (Staffordshire) Infantry Division RE)
 C Squadron at Burton-on-Trent, formed from Staffordshire Yeomanry and HQ RA 48th (South Midland) Division

The Staffordshire Yeomanry became part of the Mercian Yeomanry in 1971 (renamed the Queen's Own Mercian Yeomanry in 1973) with one of the squadrons being designated B (Staffordshire Yeomanry) Squadron.

In July 1999 B (Staffordshire Yeomanry) Squadron amalgamated with A (Queen's Own Warwickshire and Worcestershire Yeomanry) Squadron, also part of the Queen's Own Mercian Yeomanry, to form A (Staffordshire, Warwickshire and Worcestershire Yeomanry) Squadron, The Royal Mercian and Lancastrian Yeomanry at Dudley.

In July 2014 B (Staffordshire, Warwickshire and Worcestershire Yeomanry) Squadron re-subordinated to The Royal Yeomanry.  However, in 2021 the squadron lost its Stafford lineage, becoming B (Warwickshire and Worcestershire Yeomanry) Squadron following an internal reorganisation of the Royal Yeomanry.

Battle honours
The Staffordshire Yeomanry was awarded the following battle honours (honours in bold are emblazoned on the regimental colours):

See also

 Imperial Yeomanry
 List of Yeomanry Regiments 1908
 Yeomanry
 Yeomanry order of precedence
 British yeomanry during the First World War
 Second line yeomanry regiments of the British Army

Notes

References

Bibliography

External links
 
 
 British Army units from 1945 on

Staffordshire Yeomanry
Yeomanry regiments of the British Army
Yeomanry regiments of the British Army in World War I
Military units and formations established in 1794
Military units and formations disestablished in 1973
1973 disestablishments in the United Kingdom
1794 establishments in Great Britain
Military units and formations in Staffordshire
Military units and formations disestablished in 2021
Regiments of the British Army in World War II